HMS Racoon was a  steam corvette.

History
Racoon was launched on 25 April 1857 at Chatham Dockyard. In July 1863 she ran aground in Loch Ness and was damaged. She was repaired at Portsmouth, Hampshire. In May 1874, Racoon ran aground at Barbadoes. Racoon was broken up in 1877 at Devonport, Plymouth.

Prince Alfred was promoted to lieutenant on 24 February 1863, and served under Count Gleichen on the corvette.

Gallery

References

External links
 

 

1857 ships
Pearl-class corvettes
Ships built in Sheerness
Maritime incidents in July 1863
Maritime incidents in May 1874